Jonathan Albaladejo Santana (born October 30, 1982) is a Puerto Rican former professional baseball pitcher. He played for the Washington Nationals, New York Yankees and Arizona Diamondbacks in Major League Baseball (MLB), as well as the Yomiuri Giants of Nippon Professional Baseball (NPB).  He managed the Tupper Lake Riverpigs of the independent Empire League in the covid-shortened 2020 season and again in 2021.

Career

Pittsburgh Pirates
Albaladejo was selected by the San Francisco Giants in the 34th round (1,021st overall) of the 2000 Major League Baseball Draft, but did not sign.  In the following year he was selected by the Pittsburgh Pirates in the 19th round (564th overall), and signed on June 6, 2001.

He spent a number of years in the minors in the Pirates system as a starting pitcher, and in 2005 was converted to a reliever. The Pirates released him on April 25, 2007.

Washington Nationals

On May 3, 2007, Albaladejo signed a minor league contract with the Washington Nationals, and played most of the season for the Class-AA Harrisburg Senators, compiling a 4.17 earned run average in 21 appearances. He moved up to the Class-AAA Columbus Clippers and finished the season extremely well, posting an ERA of 0.78 in 14 appearances. When rosters expanded in September, the Nationals, then leading the league in innings pitched by relievers, brought him up.

On September 5, 2007, Albaladejo made his Major League debut. In the top of the third inning, in a game against the Florida Marlins, Tim Redding was injured by a batted ball and needed to be replaced. Albaladejo entered the game with two men on and one out, and allowed a ground ball (where an inherited runner scored) and a pop up.  In the fourth inning, Albaladejo struck out the side, and then was relieved.

New York Yankees
On December 4, 2007, he was traded to the New York Yankees for relief pitcher Tyler Clippard. 

He made the Yankees' Opening Day roster in 2008, but only pitched in seven games while recording a 3.95 ERA. He suffered an elbow injury on May 9, 2008, and was ruled out for the season in June. Albaladejo again made the Yankees' major league roster to start the 2009 season. After posting an ERA of 6.00 in 18 appearances through May 22, he was optioned to Triple-A Scranton/Wilkes-Barre to make room on the roster for pitcher Chien-Ming Wang. In 17 innings at Triple-A, he compiled a 1.59 ERA and 0.65 WHIP, earning a promotion back to the majors when Wang was placed on the disabled list on July 5, 2009. Albaladejo was sent back down to Scranton on July 10, 2009, to make room for Mark Melancon. Though he did not make the postseason roster, he got his first World Series ring when the Yankees won their 27th franchise World Series title by beating the Phillies.

Albaladejo began the 2010 season with Scranton/Wilkes-Barre.  After a poor spring training, Albaladejo transitioned from his two-seam fastball to his four-seam fastball, which allowed him more control.  He was named International League Pitcher of the Week from July 5–12, and from July 12–18, and pitched in the Triple-A All-Star Game.  After saving 31 games in 32 chances with a 0.96 ERA, he was called up to the Yankees on July 20. However, he was optioned back to Scranton/Wilkes-Barre on July 24 to make room for Sergio Mitre.

Albaladejo set an International League single-season record for saves in 2010 with 43 (the previous record was 38). He was named to the International League Postseason All-Star team. He was called up by the Yankees when the rosters expanded at the start of September and pitched  innings for the team during the 2010 season, recording a 3.97 ERA. During the offseason, Albaladejo asked the Yankees to release him so he could pursue a career in Japan.

Yomiuri Giants
Albaladejo signed a one-year contract with the Yomiuri Giants of Japan's Central League. In 46 games in Japan, he was 2–2 with a 2.45 ERA.

Arizona Diamondbacks
The Arizona Diamondbacks signed Albaladejo on December 13, 2011. In 49 games with the club's AAA affiliate in Reno, Albaladejo recorded 25 saves and struck out 60 in  innings of work. He was called up by the Diamondbacks at the end of the minor league season, posting an ERA of 9.00 in three games.

Miami Marlins
On December 16, 2012, Albaladejo signed a minor league deal with the Miami Marlins. He spent the entirety of the 2013 season with their AAA club, the New Orleans Zephyrs, recording a 3.80 ERA and 72 strikeouts in  innings. He was granted free agency after the season.

Broncos de Reynosa
On April 1, 2016, Albaladejo signed with the Broncos de Reynosa of the Mexican Baseball League. He was released on April 9, 2016.

Bridgeport Bluefish
On April 19, 2016, Albaladejo signed with the Bridgeport Bluefish of the Atlantic League of Professional Baseball.

New York Mets
On July 25, 2017, Albaladejo signed a minor league deal with the New York Mets. He elected free agency on November 6, 2017.

Lancaster Barnstormers
On November 1, 2017, Albaladejo was drafted by the Lancaster Barnstormers in the Bridgeport Bluefish dispersal draft. On February 26, 2018, he signed with the team for the 2018 season. Albaladejo re-signed for the 2019 season as a player-coach.

He retired as an active player following the season and was later hired as bullpen coach for the Toros de Tijuana of the Mexican League.

See also

 List of Major League Baseball players from Puerto Rico

References

External links

1982 births
Living people
Altoona Curve players
Arizona Diamondbacks players
Bridgeport Bluefish players
Columbus Clippers players
Diablos Rojos del México players
Gulf Coast Pirates players
Harrisburg Senators players
Hickory Crawdads players
Indios de Mayagüez players
Lancaster Barnstormers players
Las Vegas 51s players
Lynchburg Hillcats players
Major League Baseball pitchers
Major League Baseball players from Puerto Rico
Mexican League baseball pitchers
Miami Dade Sharks baseball players
New Orleans Zephyrs players
New York Yankees players
Puerto Rican expatriate baseball players in Mexico
Puerto Rican expatriate baseball players in Japan
Reno Aces players
Scranton/Wilkes-Barre Yankees players
Sportspeople from San Juan, Puerto Rico
Staten Island Yankees players
Tiburones de La Guaira players
Puerto Rican expatriate baseball players in Venezuela
Washington Nationals players
Yomiuri Giants players